As I See It is a 2011 Indian book by politician L. K. Advani, who served as the Deputy Prime Minister of India and former president of Bharatiya Janata Party (BJP). The book explains various issues that riveted the nation present time from Lokpal Bill to Indian currency in Swiss Banks. A collection of LK Advani’s blog posts the book analyses several volatile matters of Indian politics. His 50 years of experience in the functioning of the Indian political system is clearly reflected in the this insightful piece.

References

External links
 The Journey Continues — Author's site.
 OutlookIndia

2011 non-fiction books
Indian non-fiction books
Bharatiya Janata Party
21st-century Indian books
Rupa Publications books